Alexander Davison was a businessman.

Alexander or Alex Davison may also refer to:

Lex Davison (1923–1965), Australian racing driver
Alex Davison (born 1979), Australian racing driver
Alexander Hubert Hawdon Davison, Surveyor General of South Australia

See also
Alexander Davidson (disambiguation)